Rollot is a commune in the Somme department in Hauts-de-France in northern France.

Geography
It is the most southerly commune in the département, just a few hundred yards from the département of Oise.

History
Rollot is well known throughout France, thanks in part to the locally-made cheese of the same name, since the 18th century.

Population

Places of interest
 Saint Nicolas' church
 Saint Germain's church
 Statue of Antoine Galland
 Feudal motte with a 12th-century cave (private property)
 War memorial

Personalities

 Antoine Galland, born in 1646 at Rollot. Famous orientalist and archaeologist, best remembered as the first European translator of The Thousand and One Nights.

See also
Communes of the Somme department

References

External links

 History of the commune of Rollot 

Communes of Somme (department)